Shimon Bitton (born 27 June 1967) is an Israeli former professional footballer that has played in Hapoel Be'er Sheva.

Honours

Club
 Hapoel Beer Sheva

 Premier League:
 Third place (4): 1982/1983, 1987/1988, 1993/1994, 1996/1997
 State Cup:
 Winners (1): 1996/1997
 Runners-up (1): 1983/1984
 Toto Cup:
 Winners (2): 1988/1989, 1995/1996
 Runners-up (1): 1985/1986
 Lillian Cup:
 Winners (1): 1988
 Runners-up (2): 1982, 1983

References

1967 births
Living people
Israeli footballers
Hapoel Be'er Sheva F.C. players
Beitar Jerusalem F.C. players
Beitar Be'er Sheva F.C. players
Liga Leumit players
Israel international footballers
Footballers from Beersheba
Israeli people of Moroccan-Jewish descent
Association football fullbacks
Israeli football managers